Irina Borisovna Novikova (born 1975) is a Russian-American physicist specializing in quantum optics. She is a professor of physics at the College of William & Mary.

Early life and education
Novikova was born in 1975 in Moscow, the daughter of a physicist, and earned a diploma in engineering physics and solid state physics, summa cum laude, from the Moscow Engineering Physics Institute in 1998. She completed her Ph.D. in physics in 2003 at Texas A&M University, with the dissertation Nonlinear magneto-optic effects in optically dense Rb vapor, supervised by George R. Welch.

Recognition
Novikova was named an Optica (OSA) Fellow, in the class of 2020, "for outstanding research of quantum coherence phenomena in atomic vapors, and ongoing service to OSA and the optics community".

References

External links
Home page

1975 births
Living people
American physicists
American women physicists
Russian physicists
Russian women physicists
Moscow Engineering Physics Institute alumni
Texas A&M University alumni
College of William & Mary faculty
Fellows of Optica (society)